Velika Jastrebica (trans. "great she-hawk") is the highest summit of the Bijela Gora plateaux in the north of the Orjen range, and the second highest peak after Zubački kabao.

Mountains of Montenegro
Orjen